Erigeron corymbosus  is a North American species of flowering plants in the family Asteraceae known by the common name long-leaf fleabane. It is found in western Canada (British Columbia) and the western United States (Washington, Oregon, Idaho, Montana, Wyoming, Utah).

Erigeron corymbosus  is a perennial herb up to 50 cm (20 inches) tall, forming a taproot. Each branch produces an array of up to 16 flower heads, each head with 35–65 blue or pink ray florets plus numerous yellow disc florets.

References

corymbosus
Flora of North America
Plants described in 1840